At least six ships of the Spanish Navy have been named Neptuno:

  was a 66-gun ship of the line acquired in 1740 and sold in 1748 
  was a 68-gun ship of the line launched 6 July 1754, commissioned in 1754 and scuttled in la Havana in 1762
  was an 80-gun  launched in 1795 and wrecked in 1805
  was an 80-gun ship of the line, previously the French ship . She was captured in 1808 and broken up in 1820.
  (F-01) was a  gunboat-minelayer, commissioned in 1939, reclassified as a frigate and decommissioned in 1972 
  is a submarine rescue ship, active since 1989.

References

Spanish Navy ship names